Bill Taylor (born 3 June 1938) is a Scottish footballer, who played for St Johnstone, Stirling Albion, Partick Thistle and Luton Town.

References

1938 births
Living people
Scottish footballers
Association football goalkeepers
St Johnstone F.C. players
Stirling Albion F.C. players
Partick Thistle F.C. players
Luton Town F.C. players
Scottish Football League players
English Football League players
Cumnock Juniors F.C. players
Footballers from Dumfries and Galloway